Andrei Viktaravich Bahdanovich (born 15 October 1987) is a Belarusian sprint canoeist. He won a gold medal in the C-2 1000 m event at the 2008 Summer Olympics, rowing together with his brother Aliaksandr Bahdanovich. They finished second in this event in 2012 and fourth in the C-2 500 m in 2008.

Bahadanovich also won two medals at the ICF Canoe Sprint World Championships with a silver (C-2 1000 m: 2010) and a bronze (C-4 1000 m: 2006).

References

External links

1987 births
Living people
People from Asipovichy District
Belarusian male canoeists
Canoeists at the 2008 Summer Olympics
Canoeists at the 2012 Summer Olympics
Olympic canoeists of Belarus
Olympic gold medalists for Belarus
Olympic medalists in canoeing
Olympic silver medalists for Belarus
ICF Canoe Sprint World Championships medalists in Canadian
Medalists at the 2012 Summer Olympics
Medalists at the 2008 Summer Olympics
European Games medalists in canoeing
European Games gold medalists for Belarus
Canoeists at the 2015 European Games
Canoeists at the 2019 European Games
Universiade medalists in canoeing
Universiade silver medalists for Belarus
Universiade bronze medalists for Belarus
Medalists at the 2013 Summer Universiade
Sportspeople from Mogilev Region